Luca Scapuzzi (born 15 April 1991) is an Italian professional footballer who plays as a striker for  club Lecco.

Club career

A.C. Milan Primavera and Portogruaro
Scapuzzi joined A.C. Milan's youth system from Olmi in 2001.
He spent eight years at the A.C. Milan academy before released in June 2009. 
He joined Portogruaro at the beginning of the 2009–10 season.
Scapuzzi made his professional debut with his new club in the first league game of the season, a home loss to Ravenna on 23 August 2009.
He went on to make a total of 22 league appearances but remained scoreless as Portogruaro won promotion to Serie B.
He made 7 more appearances in the second division before mutually terminating his contract with Portogruaro in July 2011.

Manchester City
On 30 July 2011 Scapuzzi played for the Manchester City first team in the Dublin Super Cup while on trial with the Elite Development Squad. He scored after coming on as a substitute late in the game against the League of Ireland XI.
After a successful trial period with the EDS Scapuzzi signed a 3-year contract with the club.

On 19 September 2011 Scapuzzi made his official debut for the Manchester City first team as a substitute against Birmingham City in the third round of the League Cup. Luca played again in the next round of the League Cup on 26 October 2011, this time starting the match against Wolverhampton Wanderers, a game in which he made two assists and scored a deflected goal, however the goal was attributed as an own goal to the opposition goalkeeper.

Oldham Athletic (loan)
It was announced on 3 November 2011 that Scapuzzi and fellow EDS youth player Andrea Mancini would both be joining Oldham Athletic for two and one-month loan spells respectively.
Luca made his debut two days later in the starting eleven that lost 0–2 to local rivals Bury.
Unfortunately, he was replaced by substitute goalkeeper Paul Gerrard in only the tenth minute of the game as part of a tactical rearrangement of the 10-man Latics team by manager Paul Dickov after their goalkeeper Alex Cisak was shown an early straight red card for an unfair challenge in the penalty box. Three days later Scapuzzi again started for the home side in the Football League Trophy quarter-final game against Crewe Alexandra, this time managing to get on the score sheet before being substituted in the 74th minute. Scapuzzi returned to playing Premier League opponents, as he started against Liverpool in the FA Cup third round, taking the first shot in the game. On the day of the match, it was reported that Scapuzzi had signed a contract extension until the end of January. Scapuzzi ended his loan spell at Oldham Athletic with a substitute appearance in the 57th minute, in a 0–0 draw. He returned to Manchester City the following day.

Portsmouth (loan)
On 22 March 2012, it was confirmed that Scapuzzi and Rekik will join Portsmouth in a month's loan. He made his début two days later coming on as a substitute in a 2–0 defeat to Coventry City. After just two league appearances, Scapuzzi returned to Manchester City following a disappointing loan spell after finding his playing chances limited.

Varese, Siena (loan)
Scapuzzi signed for Italian Serie B side Varese on loan on 8 January 2013 until the end of the season. He made his debut as a 77th-minute sub against Brescia on 22 January 2013. In August 2013 he has signed for Italian Serie B side Siena on loan. He will wear the No. 14 shirt at Siena next season.

Calcio Como
Scapuzzi signed for Como on 9 September 2014, going on to make 15 appearances over two years.

Pro Sesto
On 11 November 2016 Scapuzzi signed for Italian Serie D side Pro Sesto on a one-year contract until June 2017.

Career statistics

Club
.

References

External links

 Career Statistic at AIC.Football.it 

1991 births
Living people
Footballers from Milan
Italian footballers
Association football forwards
Serie B players
Serie C players
Serie D players
A.S.D. Portogruaro players
S.S.D. Varese Calcio players
A.C.N. Siena 1904 players
Como 1907 players
S.S.D. Pro Sesto players
English Football League players
Manchester City F.C. players
Oldham Athletic A.F.C. players
Portsmouth F.C. players
Calcio Lecco 1912 players
Italian expatriate footballers
Italian expatriate sportspeople in England
Expatriate footballers in England